The 2022 Quebec general election was held on October 3, 2022, to elect the members of the National Assembly of Quebec. Under the province's fixed election date law, passed in 2013, "the general election following the end of a Legislature shall be held on the first Monday of October of the fourth calendar year following the year that includes the last day of the previous Legislature", setting the date for October 3, 2022.

The Coalition Avenir Québec increased its parliamentary majority in the election. The Liberals dropped to their lowest seat count since 1956 and recorded their lowest share of the popular vote in their history; however, they remained the official opposition. The Parti Québecois had its worst general election result in history, losing most of its seats, but nevertheless managed to elect its previously seatless leader Paul St-Pierre Plamondon. Previous promised plans for electoral reform were scrapped in 2021, and as such, the election produced a highly distorted result which is common in Quebec's first past the post voting system. For example, the Liberals finished fourth in the popular vote at 14%, but because their votes were concentrated on the Island of Montreal, they received more seats than both the PQ and Québec solidaire and remained the official opposition despite PQ and QS each finishing with a higher percentage of the provincial vote than the Liberals. In contrast, the Conservatives increased their share of the vote to 13%; however, as their support was more spread throughout Quebec, they did not win any seats.  Quebecers elected the highest number of women candidates to the National Assembly in the province's history at 59 women, roughly 47% of the total number of seats.

Background
The 2018 general election resulted in a landslide victory for the Coalition Avenir Québec (CAQ) led by François Legault, which won 74 of 125 seats, giving the party a majority and unseating Philippe Couillard's Liberal Party after a single term in office. Couillard subsequently resigned as Liberal leader and was replaced on an interim basis by Pierre Arcand until his successor was chosen.

Both the Parti Québécois and Québec solidaire won ten seats each, fewer than the twelve needed for official party status; Parti Québécois leader Jean-François Lisée, defeated in his bid for re-election, resigned as party leader, replaced on an interim basis by Pascal Bérubé until his successor was chosen. Adrien D. Pouliot, leader of the Conservative Party of Quebec, announced that he was stepping down as leader on October 16, 2020.

Following Couillard's resignation, the Quebec Liberal Party held a leadership race. Dominique Anglade, former Deputy Premier of Quebec, was acclaimed leader of the party after her only rival, former mayor of Drummondville, Alexandre Cusson, stepped down. Following a leadership race, Paul St-Pierre Plamondon was elected leader of the sovereignist party by the members and supporters of the Parti Québécois. Following Pouliot's resignation, the Conservative Party of Quebec held a leadership race. Éric Duhaime, a radio host and former political advisor, was elected as leader with just under 96% of the vote.

Political parties and standings
The table below lists parties represented and seats held in the National Assembly after the 2018 provincial election and at dissolution.

Timeline

2018
October 1, 2018: The Coalition Avenir Québec led by François Legault wins a majority government in the 42nd Quebec general election. Parti Québécois leader Jean-François Lisée, defeated in his bid for re-election, announces his resignation as party leader.
October 5, 2018: Mont-Royal–Outremont MNA Pierre Arcand is named interim leader of the Quebec Liberal Party.
October 9, 2018: Matane-Matapédia MNA Pascal Bérubé is named interim leader of the Parti Québécois.

2019

2020
March 20, 2020: The 2020 Quebec Liberal Party leadership election is suspended indefinitely due to the COVID-19 pandemic in Quebec. 
May 11, 2020: Saint-Henri–Sainte-Anne MNA Dominique Anglade is selected as leader of the Quebec Liberal Party by acclamation following the withdrawal of rival candidate Alexandre Cusson.
October 9, 2020: Paul St-Pierre Plamondon wins the 2020 Parti Québécois leadership election.

2021
April 17, 2021: Éric Duhaime wins the 2021 Conservative Party of Quebec leadership election.

2022
May 13, 2022: The English language leaders' debate is called off for the election after two party leaders, (CAQ) Coalition Avenir Québec Premier François Legault, and PQ Parti Québécois leader Paul St-Pierre Plamondon refused to participate.

Campaign

Timeline 
August 28, 2022: Campaign period officially begins with the calling of an October 3 election.
September 1, 2022: PQ Parti Québécois leader Paul St-Pierre Plamondon stages an event in Ottawa.
September 4, 2022: Radio-Canada's Five leaders, one election.
September 7, 2022: (CAQ) Coalition Avenir Québec Premier François Legault apologizes for comments linking immigration and 'extremism,' and 'violence'.
September 11, 2022: In a speech in Drummondville (CAQ) Coalition Avenir Québec Premier François Legault, Says that non-French speaking immigration threatens Quebec cohesion. He was criticized by the leaders of Quebec solidaire, Quebec Liberal and Parti Québécois.
September 12, 2022: (CAQ) Coalition Avenir Québec Premier François Legault defends the comments he said the day before about immigration.
September 15, 2022: First leaders debate TVA Leaders' Debate.
September 22, 2022: Radio Canada's Leaders' Debate.
September 28, 2022: (CAQ) Coalition Avenir Québec Premier François Legault says during a speech, that having higher immigration numbers would be suicidal for Quebec and the French language. Legault was criticized by the other party leaders.
 CAQ Immigration and labour minister Jean Boulet walks back from his past comments during a debate a few days before. He said that 80% of immigrants go to Montreal, don't work, don't speak French and don't adhere to the values of Quebec.

 Party slogans 

 Issues 

 Role of disinformation during the campaign 
During the campaign, the issue of online political disinformation misleading voters has been raised by outlets including the Canadian Broadcasting Corporation (CBC). In September 2022, the CBC reported that opponents of COVID-19 pandemic restrictions used Facebook to spread a false rumor that Legault was booed out of a restaurant. According to CBC, "The post is one of many on social media that are misleading or outright false, with real-world consequences to both those who read it and to those involved in the event".

According to the Centre for Media, Technology and Democracy (MTD) at McGill University, false allegations that polling outlets are unfairly biased against certain parties have spread on social media. Some online supporters of the Conservative Party of Quebec alleged collusion between the governing Coalition Avenir Québec (CAQ) and polling firm Léger. In response, a citizens' initiative emerged on Facebook urging individuals to file complaints over Léger, despite the fact that Élections Québec has no power to regulate the polling industry.

 Candidates 

The candidates standing for election generally had the following characteristics:

Incumbents not running for reelection

 Candidate controversies 

 Quebec Liberal Party 
 Deepak Awasti, the party's candidate in Laurier-Dorion, for denying Quebec's right to register itself as a nation within the Canadian constitution and to have French as its sole official language, contrary to his party's official position.

 Parti Québécois 
 Pierre Vanier, the party's candidate in Rousseau, for past social media posts emerged where Vanier expressed anti-Islamic views. He was suspended as a candidate.
 Catherine Provost, the party's candidate in L’Assomption, for past social media posts emerged where Provost expressed Anti-Islam views.
 Lyne Jubinville, the party's candidate in Sainte-Rose, for past social media posts emerged where Jubinville expressed Anti-Islam views.
 Andréanne Fiola, candidate for Laval-des-Rapides, previously made porn. Party leader Paul St-Pierre Plamondon defended Fiola and condemned the individuals who outed her.
 Paul St-Pierre Plamondon's use of the word nègre during a televised debate. 

 Québec Solidaire 
Marie-Eve Rancourt, the party's candidate in Camille-Laurin, withdrew from the race after she was caught removing PQ leaflets.
Gabriel Nadeau-Dubois' use of the N-word during a televised debate.

 Coalition Avenir Québec 

 Shirley Dorismond, the party's candidate in Marie-Victorin, for blocking numerous constituents and electors on social media after facing criticisms on her comments about the September 13, 2022 floods in Longueuil.

Opinion polls

This chart depicts opinion polls conducted since the 2018 election, using a local regression. The table below provides a list of scientific, public opinion polls that were conducted from the 2018 Quebec general election leading up to the 2022 Quebec general election, which was held on October 3, 2022.

 Cancelled electoral reform referendum 

François Legault was elected on a promise to reform the electoral system within a year of his victory.  On September 25, 2019, Minister of Justice Sonia LeBel presented Bill 39, An Act to establish a new electoral system which aims to replace the first-past-the-post electoral system in favour of a mixed-member proportional representation system.  According to the bill, the National Assembly would have kept 125 members. Of the 125 members, 80 would have been elected by receiving a plurality of votes in single-member districts, similar to the existing system, matching the 78 federal ridings with the addition of 2 unique districts: Îles-de-la-Madeleine and Ungava. The remaining 45 members would have been chosen according to their order in a regional party list. All 17 regions of Québec would have been guaranteed at least one MNA.

The proposed system was as such:

Bill 39 was intended to be debated in the legislature before June 2021. The bill's implementation would have been contingent on popular support expressed in a referendum held on the same day as the general election.  Had this referendum been successful, then the first legislature to be elected under mixed-member proportional would have been the 44th, in October 2026 at the latest. On April 28, 2021, Justice Minister LeBel informed a legislative committee hearing that the government would not move forward with a referendum on electoral reform in 2022. LeBel blamed the COVID-19 pandemic for altering the government's timeline and could not or would not commit to providing an alternate date for the referendum, effectively ending discussions about electoral reform in Quebec.

 Results 
All parties experienced uneven results across the province:

 While the CAQ saw its share of the vote rise by over 10 percentage points from 2018 in 21 ridings, its support also declined in 38 ridings, most significantly in those in Centre-du-Québec and Chaudière-Appalaches. In those regions, and in Mauricie, the contests were between the CAQ and the Conservatives. In Quebec City, the QS is also a significant player. In the Côte-Nord and Saguenay–Lac-Saint-Jean its principal opponent is the PQ.
 The Liberal Party lost support in all ridings, with the exception of Marquette, and its decline in the ridings along the Orange Line in Montreal worsened from 2014. In Saguenay–Lac-Saint-Jean, its share of the vote fell to 4%, and in the Côte-Nord it dropped to 3%.
 Québec Solidaire lost the riding of Rouyn-Noranda–Témiscamingue only because of a swing from the Liberals to the CAQ.
 While the PQ lost several strongholdsnotably in Jonquière, René-Lévesque and Rimouskiits support remained stable in 29 ridings and showed small gains in 28 others.
 The Conservative Party saw its total share of the vote increase ninefold with its percentage vote share rising in all contests, and in 12 ridings it increased by more than 20 percentage points. In addition to its strong gains in the regions south of Quebec Citywith several second-place resultsit also received significant anglophone support in the West Island ridings of Nelligan, Robert-Baldwin and D'Arcy-McGee.

In Beauce-Nord, the Conservatives sought a judicial recount as they had come within 202 votes of defeating the CAQ incumbent Luc Provençal. The application was dismissed by the Court of Quebec.

Overview

|-
! colspan=2 rowspan=2 | Political party
! rowspan=2 | Party leader
! colspan=5 | MNAs
! colspan=4 | Votes
|-
! Candidates
!2018
!Dissol.
!2022
!Changefrom 2018
!#
!±
!%
! ± (pp)
|-

| style="text-align:left;" |François Legault
|125
|74
|76
|90
|16
|1,685,573
|176,124
|40.98
|3.56
|-

| style="text-align:left;" |Dominique Anglade
|125
|31
|27
|21
|10
|591,077
|409,960
|14.37
|10.45
|-

| style="text-align:left;" |Gabriel Nadeau-Dubois and Manon Massé
|125
|10
|10
|11
|1
|634,535
|14,968
|15.43
|0.67
|-

| style="text-align:left;" |Paul St-Pierre Plamondon
|125
|10
|7
|3
|7
|600 708
|87,287
|14.61
|2.45
|-

| style="text-align:left;" |Éric Duhaime
|125
|–
|1
|–
|–
|530,786
|471,731
|12.91
|11.45
|-

| style="text-align:left;" |Alex Tyrrell
|73
|–
|–
|–
|–
|31,054
|36,816
|0.75
|0.93
|-

| style="text-align:left;" |Colin Standish
|20
|–
|–
|–
|–
|12,981
|
|0.32
|
|-

| style="text-align:left;" |Martine Ouellet
|54
|–
|–
|–
|–
|8,644
|
|0.21
|
|-

| style="text-align:left;" |Balarama Holness
|13
|–
|–
|–
|–
|7,774
|
|0.19
|
|-
| style="background-color:#be9538;" |
| style="text-align:left;" |Democratie directe
| style="text-align:left;" |Jean Charles Cléroux
|28
|–
|–
|–
|–
|2,421
|
|0.06
|
|-

| style="text-align:left;" |–
|14
|–
|4
|–
|–
|2,121
|4,341
|0.05
|0.11
|-

| style="text-align:left;" |Renaud Blais
|9
|–
|–
|–
|–
|1,074
|2,585
|0.03
|0.06
|-

| style="text-align:left;" |Georges Samman
|9
|–
|–
|–
|–
|1,042
|
|0.03
|
|-
| style="background-color:#3d559a;" |
| style="text-align:left;" |Parti 51
| style="text-align:left;" |Hans Mercier
|5
|–
|–
|–
|–
|689
|428
|0.02
|0.01
|-

| style="text-align:left;" |Pierre Chénier
|12
|–
|–
|–
|–
|675
|1,033
|0.02
|0.02
|-

| style="text-align:left;" |Stéphane Pouleur
|10
|–
|–
|–
|–
|556
|582
|0.01
|0.02
|-
| style="background-color:#fedd2e;" |
| style="text-align:left;" |Parti culinaire
| style="text-align:left;" |Jean-Louis Thémistocle
|2
|–
|–
|–
|–
|356
|187
|0.01
|0.01
|-
| style="background-color:white;" |
| style="text-align:left;" |Parti humain
| style="text-align:left;" |Marie-Ève Ouellette
|2
|–
|–
|–
|–
|262
|
|0.01
|
|-

| style="text-align:left;" |Jonathan Blanchette
|1
|–
|–
|–
|–
|159
|
|–
|
|-
| style="background-color:#0131B4;" |
| style="text-align:left;" |Alliance for family and communities
| style="text-align:left;" |Alain Rioux
|2
|–
|–
|–
|–
|148
|
|–
|
|-

| style="text-align:left;" |Charles-Olivier Bolduc
|1
|–
|–
|–
|–
|116
|
|–
|
|-
| style="background-color:white;" |
| style="text-align:left;" |Access to property and equity
| style="text-align:left;" |Shawn Lalande McLean
|1
|–
|–
|–
|–
|70
|
|–
|
|-

| style="text-align:left;" |
| rowspan="7" colspan="9" style="text-align:center;"|did not campaign|-

| style="text-align:left;" |
|-
| bgcolor="#6C0277" | 
| style="text-align:left;" |Changement intégrité pour notre Québec
| style="text-align:left;" |
|-
| bgcolor="#003399" | 
| style="text-align:left;" |Citoyens au pouvoir du Québec
| style="text-align:left;" |
|-

| style="text-align:left;" |
|-

| style="text-align:left;" |
|-

| style="text-align:left;" |
|-
! colspan="3" style="text-align:left;" | Total
| 880 
! colspan="4"| 125
! colspan="2"| 4,112,821
! colspan="2"| 100%
|-
| colspan="8" style="text-align:left;" | Rejected ballots
| 56,316
| 9,769
| colspan="2"|
|-
| colspan="8" style="text-align:left;" | Voter turnout
| 4,169,137
| 69,514
| 66.15%
| 0.30
|-
| colspan="8" style="text-align:left;" | Registered electors
| 6,302,789
| 133,017
| colspan="2"|
|}

Synopsis of riding results

 Results summary by region 

Detailed analysis

 Seats changing hands 

The following seats changed allegiance from the 2018 election: 

PQ to CAQ
 Bonaventure
 Duplessis
 Gaspé
 Joliette
 Jonquière
 Marie-Victorin*
 René-Lévesque
 Rimouski

Liberal to CAQ
 Anjou–Louis-Riel
 Fabre
 Hull
 Jean-Talon*
 Laporte
 Laval-des-Rapides
 Roberval*
 Vimont

CAQ to PQ
 Camille-Laurin

Liberal to QS
 Maurice-Richard
 Verdun

QS to CAQ
 Rouyn-Noranda–Témiscamingue* - byelection gains held''

Incumbent MNAs who were defeated

Significant results among independent and minor party candidates
Those candidates not belonging to a major party, receiving more than 1,000 votes in the election, are listed below:

Notes

References

See also

2022
2022 elections in Canada
General election
October 2022 events in Canada